West Liberty-Salem High School is a public high school in Salem Township, Champaign County, Ohio, United States.  The only high school in the West Liberty-Salem School District, it is situated along U.S. Route 68 between West Liberty, Urbana.

West Liberty-Salem partners with Edison State Community College In Piqua, Ohio to allow students in grades 7-12 to take college level courses free of charge  and with Ohio High Point Career In Bellefontaine, Ohio to allow students in grades 11 and 12 to take vocational courses.

West Liberty-Salem is the only school in Champaign County, Ohio that has a Science Olympiad program at the middle school level.

West Liberty-Salem is well known for the success of its track and field and cross country programs having won a total of 23 high school Track and Field OHC championships and a total of 29 high school OHC championships in cross country.

History 

West Liberty-Salem High School was formed in 1961 when West Liberty High School (West Liberty, OH) and Salem Township High School (Kingscreek, OH) merged.  In 1985 the West Liberty-Salem School District began construction on a new comprehensive school complex along U.S. Highway 68 just south of West Liberty, opening in 1989, the complex is still being used today.

In 2011 then-high school Track and Field athlete Meghan Vogel made national headlines for carrying a fallen runner to the finish line

West Liberty-Salem has conducted several renovations since 1989 including new visitor bleachers at the football stadium in 2014, new high school science classrooms in 2016, new kindergarten and first grade classrooms in 2015 and the installation of blinds over the windows on all doors in 2017

On January 20, 2017 there was a shooting injuring two students, one critically. 17-year-old student Ely Serna was charged in the incident and was sentenced to 23 years in prison.

The school is currently raising funds for an athletic field house which would include bathrooms, locker rooms, a weight room, a basketball court and a track

Ohio High School Athletic Association State Championships

 Girls Cross Country - 2020
Girls Track & Field - 2019, 2021 
 Boys Wrestling – 1991 
 Boys Cross Country – 1976, 1977, 1978, 1979 
 Boys Basketball (Salem High School) - 1960

Ohio Heritage Conference Championships 
 Boys Football - 2004, 2009, 2011, 2012, 2014, 2019
 Boys Basketball - 2006, 2016, 2018, 2020
 Boys Bowling - 2014
 Boys Baseball - 2002, 2005, 2006, 2010
 Boys Track & Field - 2004, 2005, 2007, 2011, 2012, 2013, 2015, 2016, 2017, 2021
 Boys Cross Country - 2001, 2002, 2003, 2009, 2010, 2011, 2012, 2013, 2014, 2015, 2016, 2018, 2019, 2020
 Boys Golf - 2010, 2011, 2012, 2013, 2014, 2016
 Wrestling - 2005
 Girls Volleyball - 2008, 2009, 2010, 2011, 2012
 Girls Basketball - 2003, 2005, 2006, 2007, 2008, 2009, 2010, 2011, 2016, 2017, 2018, 2019, 2021
 Girls Softball - 2004, 2005, 2006, 2007, 2008, 2009, 2010, 2011, 2012, 2017, 2018
 Girls Track & Field - 2002, 2003, 2004, 2005, 2009, 2010, 2012, 2013, 2014, 2015, 2016, 2017, 2018, 2019, 2021
 Girls Soccer - 2014, 2015, 2017, 2018
 Girls Cross Country - 2001, 2002, 2003, 2004, 2005, 2006, 2007, 2008, 2009, 2010, 2011, 2012, 2014, 2015, 2016, 2017, 2018, 2019, 2020

References

External links
  School shooting
 District website

Education in Logan County, Ohio
High schools in Champaign County, Ohio
U.S. Route 68
Public high schools in Ohio
Educational institutions established in 1961
1961 establishments in Ohio